Amos Mansdorf defeated Ramesh Krishnan 6–3, 6–4 to win the 1988 Heineken Open singles competition. Miloslav Mečíř was the champion but did not defend his title.

Seeds
A champion seed is indicated in bold text while text in italics indicates the round in which that seed was eliminated.

  Peter Lundgren (quarterfinals)
  Amos Mansdorf (champion)
  Jonas Svensson (second round)
  Carl-Uwe Steeb (first round)
  John Frawley (quarterfinals)
  Jim Pugh (semifinals)
  Michiel Schapers (second round)
  Dan Goldie (quarterfinals)

Draw

Key
 Q – Qualifier
 WC – Wild card

External links
 Association of Tennis Professional (ATP) – 1988 Men's Singles draw

Singles
ATP Auckland Open